Alpheus Elbridge Deane (October 11, 1916 – June 22, 1986) was an American Negro league pitcher in the 1940s.

A native of Key West, Florida, Deane played for the New York Black Yankees in 1947. He died in Miami, Florida in 1986 at age 69.

References

External links
 and Seamheads

1916 births
1986 deaths
New York Black Yankees players
20th-century African-American sportspeople